is a Japanese manga series written and illustrated by Sanzo.  The series is published in English by Seven Seas Entertainment.

Plot
Yuuma, a normal human, begins dating an anthropomorphic Tyrannosaurus rex named Churio, and must deal with the problems that dating a humanoid dinosaur entails.

Characters

Churio's boyfriend and the series' protagonist.

An anthropomorphic Tyrannosaurus rex with a ravenous appetite.

Release
Sanzo launched the series in Kadokawa's online magazine Gene Pixiv (a collaboration between Monthly Comic Gene and Pixiv) on 27 October 2014.  Seven Seas Entertainment announced their license to the series in December 2015, with plans to begin publishing it in North America in November 2016.

Volumes

References

External links

  at Pixiv 
  at Seven Seas Entertainment
 

Media Factory manga
Seven Seas Entertainment titles
Dinosaurs in anime and manga
Romance anime and manga
Comedy anime and manga